1298 Nocturna, provisional designation , is a dark asteroid from the outer regions of the asteroid belt, approximately 40 kilometers in diameter. It was discovered on 7 January 1934, by German astronomer Karl Reinmuth at the Heidelberg Observatory in southwest Germany. The asteroid's name is the Feminine adjective of nocturnus, "nightly".

Orbit and classification 

Nocturna is a non-family asteroid of the main belt's background population. It orbits the Sun in the outer asteroid belt at a distance of 2.7–3.6 AU once every 5 years and 6 months (2,018 days). Its orbit has an eccentricity of 0.15 and an inclination of 5° with respect to the ecliptic.

The body's observation arc begins 30 years later, with its official discovery observation at Heidelberg in 1934.

Physical characteristics 

Nocturna has been characterized as an X-type asteroid by PanSTARRS photometric survey. It is also an assumed carbonaceous C-type asteroid.

Rotation period 

In February 2006, a rotational lightcurve of Nocturna was obtained from photometric observations by French amateur astronomer René Roy. Lightcurve analysis gave a rotation period of 34.80 hours with a brightness amplitude of 0.11 magnitude. Nocturna has a longer-than-average period, as most asteroids rotate within less than 20 hours once around their axis.

Diameter and albedo 

According to the surveys carried out by the Infrared Astronomical Satellite IRAS, the Japanese Akari satellite and the NEOWISE mission of NASA's Wide-field Infrared Survey Explorer, Nocturna measures between 37.80 and 44.62 kilometers in diameter and its surface has an albedo between 0.04 and 0.0578.

The Collaborative Asteroid Lightcurve Link derives an albedo of 0.0441 and a diameter of 39.93 kilometers based on an absolute magnitude of 11.0.

Naming 

This minor planet was named "Nocturna" after the feminine adjective of nocturnus which means "nightly". The official naming citation was mentioned in The Names of the Minor Planets by Paul Herget in 1955.

References

External links 
 Asteroid Lightcurve Database (LCDB), query form (info )
 Dictionary of Minor Planet Names, Google books
 Asteroids and comets rotation curves, CdR – Observatoire de Genève, Raoul Behrend
 Discovery Circumstances: Numbered Minor Planets (1)-(5000) – Minor Planet Center
 
 

001298
Discoveries by Karl Wilhelm Reinmuth
Named minor planets
19340107